Coleophora fuscinervella is a moth of the family Coleophoridae. It is found in Tunisia.

The larvae feed on Calligonum comosum. They feed on the generative organs of their host plant.

References

fuscinervella
Endemic fauna of Tunisia
Moths described in 1956
Moths of Africa